Kenwyn is a suburb of Cape Town, South Africa between the Southern Suburbs and Cape Flats. It is south of the N2. The surrounding suburbs include Lansdowne, Kenilworth and Wetton.

Education

Schools
Kenwyn Primary School
Oaklands High School
Sunlands Primary School

Sport
Chukker Road Sports Complex, in Kenwyn, is home to the Victoria Cricket Club, the Varsity Old Boys Baseball and Softball Club and the Lansdowne Eagles Baseball and Softball Club.

References

Further reading
 Phil Olivier (comp.) Ons gemeentelike feesalbum. Kaapstad en Pretoria: N. G. Kerk-uitgewers, 1952 (NG gemeente Van Riebeeck).

Suburbs of Cape Town